Shanghai Tobacco Group Co., Ltd. is a subsidiary of state-owned China Tobacco. The company produced Chunghwa, Double Happiness, Zhongnanhai and other brands. The company also known as a minority shareholders of Bank of Communications, Orient Securities, Haitong Securities and China Pacific Insurance Company via Shanghai Haiyan Investment Management.

References

Conglomerate companies of China
China Tobacco